The prehistory of Papua New Guinea can be traced to about 50,000–60,000 years ago, when people first migrated towards the Australian continent. The written history began when European navigators first sighted New Guinea in the early part of the 17th century.

Archaeology

Archaeological evidence indicates that humans arrived on New Guinea perhaps 60,000 years ago, although this is under debate. They came probably by sea from Southeast Asia during an Ice Age period when the sea was lower and distances between islands shorter. Although the first arrivals were hunters and gatherers, early evidence shows that people managed the forest environment to provide food. There also are indications of neolithic gardening having been practiced at Kuk at the same time that agriculture was developing in Mesopotamia and Egypt. Today's staples – sweet potatoes and pigs – were later arrivals, but shellfish and fish have long been mainstays of coastal dwellers' diets.

European contact

When Europeans first arrived, inhabitants of New Guinea and nearby islands, whose technologies included bone, wood, and stone tools, had a productive agricultural system. They traded along the coast (mainly in pottery, shell ornaments and foodstuffs) and in the interior (exchanging forest products for shells and other sea products).

The first known Europeans to sight New Guinea were probably the Portuguese and Spanish navigators sailing in the South Pacific in the early part of the 16th century. In 1526–1527 the Portuguese explorer Jorge de Menezes accidentally came upon the principal island and is credited with naming it "Papua", after a Malay word for the frizzled quality of Melanesian people's hair. The Spaniard Yñigo Ortiz de Retez applied the term "New Guinea" to the island in 1545 because of a perceived resemblance between the islands' inhabitants and those found on the African Guinea coast.

Although European navigators visited the islands and explored their coastlines thereafter, European researchers knew little of the inhabitants until the 1870s, when Russian anthropologist Nicholai Miklukho-Maklai made a number of expeditions to New Guinea, spending several years living among native tribes, and described their way of life in a comprehensive treatise.

Territory of Papua

In 1883, the Colony of Queensland tried to annex the southern half of eastern New Guinea, but the British government did not approve. However, when Germany began settlements in the north a British protectorate was proclaimed in 1884 over the southern coast of New Guinea and its adjacent islands. The protectorate, called British New Guinea, was annexed outright on 4 September 1888. The possession was placed under the authority of the Commonwealth of Australia in 1902. Following the passage of the Papua Act in 1905, British New Guinea became the Territory of Papua, and formal Australian administration began in 1906, although Papua remained under their control as a British possession until the independence of Papua New Guinea in 1975.

There was little economic activity in Papua. Australia administered it separately under the Papua Act until it was invaded by the Empire of Japan in 1941, and civil administration suspended. During the Pacific War, Papua was governed by an Australian military administration from Port Moresby, where General Douglas MacArthur occasionally made his headquarters.

German New Guinea

With Europe's growing desire for coconut oil, Godeffroy's of Hamburg, the largest trading firm in the Pacific, began trading for copra in the New Guinea Islands. In 1884, the German Empire formally took possession of the northeast quarter of the island and put its administration in the hands of a chartered trading company formed for the purpose, the German New Guinea Company. In the charter granted to this company by the German Imperial Government in May 1885, it was given the power to exercise sovereign rights over the territory and other "unoccupied" lands in the name of the government, and the ability to "negotiate" directly with the native inhabitants. Relationships with foreign powers were retained as the preserve of the German government. The Neu Guinea Kompanie paid for the local governmental institutions directly, in return for the concessions which had been awarded to it. In 1899, the German imperial government assumed direct control of the territory, thereafter known as German New Guinea.

New Guinea was basically a business venture. Thousands of local workers were hired as cheap labor on cocoa and copra plantations. In 1899, the German government took control of the colony from the New Guinea company of Berlin. Education was in the hands of missionaries. In 1914 when the First World War broke out Australia seized the German colony. The plantations were given to Australian war veterans and in 1921 the League of Nations gave Australia a trusteeship over New Guinea.  The plantations and gold mining generated a degree of prosperity.

Territory of New Guinea

The Commonwealth of Australia assumed a mandate from the League of Nations for governing the former German territory of New Guinea in 1920. It was administered under this mandate until the Japanese invasion in December 1941 brought about the suspension of Australian civil administration. Much of the Territory of New Guinea, including the islands of Bougainville and New Britain, was occupied by Japanese forces before being recaptured by Australian and American forces during the final months of the war (see New Guinea campaign).

Exploration of Mandated Territory of New Guinea

Akmana Expedition 1929–1930

The exploration of Papua–New Guinea has been a continuing process. As of October 2017 new groups of people occasionally are still contacted. Not until recent years has New Guinea's exploration been planned; much of it has been the work of miners, labour recruiters, missionaries, adventurers, with different objectives in mind. Many of these people have been doers, not recorders of facts, with the result that our knowledge of the territory's exploration has not kept pace with the exploration itself.

An exception is the record of the Akmana Gold Prospecting Company's Field Party which carried out two expeditions from September to December 1929 and from mid February to the end of June 1930.

During their first expedition the Akmana Field Party prospected the tributaries of the Arrabundio and then trekked across a spur of the Central Mountain Range to sample the Upper Karrawaddi River. Retracing their steps to the Arrabundio they then headed out across another spur of the Central Mountain Range to the Junction of the Yuat River with the Jimmi and Baiyer Rivers, again without finding gold in sufficient quantity. Returning to Madang at the end of December 1929, several of the party went back to Sydney to obtain instructions from the Akmana Gold Prospecting Company.

In mid February 1930 the second expedition quickly returned to their Mountain Base and on across the mountains to the junction of the Yuat with the Baiyer and Jimmi Rivers. They prospected south along the Baiyer River to its junction with the Maramuni and Tarua Rivers, where they established a palisaded forward camp naming the place 'Akmana Junction.' From this base they prospected along the Maramuni River and its tributaries, again without success. Finally they prospected the Tarua River south past the tributary which flows to Waipai, once more without success and on the advice of mining engineer Seale, it was decided there was nothing to justify further exploration. They had not progressed to any country on the southern watershed through which the early explorers and prospectors travelled to the Hagan Range and Wabag. The party returned to Madang, sailing for Sydney on 3 July 1930.

After leading the first expedition, Sam Freeman did not return and Reg Beazley became party leader of the second expedition, with Pontey Seale mining engineer, Bill MacGregor and Beazley prospectors and recruiters, and Ernie Shepherd in charge of transport and supplies, prospecting when opportunity arose. They had all served overseas during World War I with the AIF on the western front, in Egypt and the Levant and had previously been to New Guinea. Beazley was drilling test sites for oil with Matahower in the lower Sepik and he and McGregor recruited labour on the Sepik and explored grass country to Wee Wak. Beazley also prospected the Arrabundio for gold and on his promising report to Freeman, Akmana Gold Prospecting Coy was floated in 1928.

The Akmana Gold Prospecting Field Party made contact with many peoples they called: grass country people, head hunters, pygmies, wig–men, Kanakas, Poomani. These contacts were often with the help of Drybow/Dribu, a leader and spokesman of the wig–men, a most intelligent man of goodwill, with a quiet authority that brought forth friendly cooperation. 'We made a peaceful entry into this new country, establishing a reputation for fair trade and decent behaviour ... but gold was our interest and we had traced the rivers and tributaries as far as practicable where conditions and results justified the effort and found nothing worthwhile. In the many years since, there have been quite a few reports of prospecting parties in the area. But nothing of note has been reported: So we did not leave much behind, it seems.'

'Members of the Akmana party donated wigs they had brought back to various museums. Two of them went to The Australian Museum, Sydney (from Beazley and Shepherd). Current records at the Australian Museum show that Beazley's wig, described as "a cap composed of human hair from the headwaters of the U–at River, Central Mountains, Mandated Territory of NG", was lodged on 31 January 1930, presumably on his quick visit to Sydney after the first expedition. Shepherd presented another wig to Father Kirschbaum, who wanted to send it to Germany. The wigs at The Australian Museum were later confused with some brought out of the Highlands 10 years afterwards by Jim Taylor during his Hagen–Sepik patrol, and wrongly attributed to him when put on display. Seale presented two wigs to the National Museum Canberra in 1930.'

World War II

Shortly after the start of the Pacific War, the island of New Guinea was invaded by the Japanese. Most of West Papua, at that time known as Dutch New Guinea, was occupied, as were large parts of the Territory of New Guinea (the former German New Guinea, which was also under Australian rule after World War I), but Papua was protected to a large extent by its southern location and the near-impassable Owen Stanley Ranges to the north.

The New Guinea campaign opened with the battles for New Britain and New Ireland in the Territory of New Guinea in 1942. Rabaul, the capital of the Territory was overwhelmed on 22–23 January and was established as a major Japanese base from whence they landed on mainland New Guinea and advanced towards Port Moresby and Australia. Having had their initial effort to capture Port Moresby by a seaborne invasion disrupted by the U.S. Navy in the Battle of the Coral Sea, the Japanese attempted a landward invasion from the north via the Kokoda Trail. From July 1942, a few Australian reserve battalions, many of them very young and untrained, fought a stubborn rearguard action against a Japanese advance along the Kokoda Track, towards Port Moresby, over the rugged Owen Stanley Ranges. Local Papuans, called Fuzzy Wuzzy Angels by the Australians, assisted and escorted injured Australian troops down the Kokoda trail. The militia, worn out and severely depleted by casualties, were relieved in late August by regular troops from the Second Australian Imperial Force, returning from action in the Mediterranean theatre.

The Japanese were driven back. The bitter Battle of Buna-Gona followed in which Australian and United States forces attacked the main Japanese beachheads in New Guinea, at Buna, Sanananda and Gona. Facing tropical disease, difficult terrain and well constructed Japanese defences, the allies only secured victory with heavy casualties.

In early September 1942 Japanese marines attacked a strategic Royal Australian Air Force base at Milne Bay, near the eastern tip of Papua. They were beaten back by the Australian Army, and the Battle of Milne Bay is remembered as the first outright defeat on Japanese land forces during World War II. The offensives in Papua and New Guinea of 1943–44 were the single largest series of connected operations ever mounted by the Australian armed forces. The Supreme Commander of operations was the United States General Douglas MacArthur, with Australian General Thomas Blamey taking a direct role in planning and operations being essentially directed by staff at New Guinea Force headquarters in Port Moresby. Bitter fighting continued in New Guinea between the largely Australian force and the Japanese 18th Army based in New Guinea until the Japanese surrender in 1945.

The New Guinea campaign was a major campaign of the Pacific War. In all, some 200,000 Japanese soldiers, sailors and airmen died during the campaign against approximately 7,000 Australian and 7,000 American service personnel.

The Territory of Papua and New Guinea

Following the surrender of the Japanese in 1945, civil administration of Papua as well as New Guinea was restored, and under the Papua New Guinea Provisional Administration Act, (1945–46), Papua and New Guinea were combined in an administrative union.

The Papua and New Guinea Act 1949 formally approved the placing of New Guinea under the international trusteeship system and confirmed the administrative union under the title of The Territory of Papua and New Guinea. The Act provided for a Legislative Council (established in 1951), a judicial organization, a public service, and a system of local government, with Sir Donald Cleland as administrator. Cleland remained in the position until his retirement in 1967, and lived in Port Moresby until his death in 1975. The House of Assembly of Papua and New Guinea replaced the Legislative Council in 1963, and after elections on 15 February, opened on 8 June 1964. In 1972, the name of the territory was changed to Papua New Guinea.
Australia's change of policy towards Papua New Guinea largely commenced with the invitation from the Australian Government to the World Bank to send a mission to the Territory to advise on measures to be taken towards its economic development and political preparation.  The mission's report, The Economic Development of the Territory of Papua New Guinea, published in 1964, set out the framework upon which much of later economic policy, up to and beyond independence, proceeded.

Independence
Elections in 1972 resulted in the formation of a ministry headed by Chief Minister Michael Somare, who pledged to lead the country to self-government and then to independence. Papua New Guinea became self-governing on 1 December 1973 and achieved independence on 16 September 1975. The country joined the United Nations (UN) on 10 October 1975 by way of Security Council Resolution 375 and General Assembly resolution 3368.

The 1977 national elections confirmed Michael Somare as Prime Minister at the head of a coalition led by the Pangu Party. However, his government lost a vote of confidence in 1980 and was replaced by a new cabinet headed by Sir Julius Chan as prime minister. The 1982 elections increased Pangu's plurality, and parliament again chose Somare as prime minister. In November 1985, the Somare government lost another vote of no confidence, and the parliamentary majority elected Paias Wingti, at the head of a five-party coalition, as prime minister. A coalition, headed by Wingti, was victorious in very close elections in July 1987. In July 1988, a no-confidence vote toppled Wingti and brought to power Rabbie Namaliu, who a few weeks earlier had replaced Somare as leader of the Pangu Party.

Such reversals of fortune and a revolving-door succession of prime ministers continue to characterize Papua New Guinea's national politics. A plethora of political parties, coalition governments, shifting party loyalties and motions of no confidence in the leadership all lend an air of instability to political proceedings.

Under legislation intended to enhance stability, new governments remain immune from no-confidence votes for the first 18 months of their incumbency.

A nine-year secessionist revolt on the island of Bougainville claimed some 20,000 lives. The rebellion began in early 1989, active hostilities ended with a truce in October 1997 and a permanent ceasefire was signed in April 1998. A peace agreement between the Government and ex-combatants was signed in August 2001. A regional peace-monitoring force and a UN observer mission monitors the government and provincial leaders who have established an interim administration and are working toward complete surrender of weapons, the election of a provincial government and an eventual referendum on independence.

The government and rebels negotiated a peace agreement that established the Bougainville Autonomous District and Province. The autonomous Bougainville elected Joseph Kabui as president in 2005, who served until his death in 2008. He was succeeded by his deputy John Tabinaman as acting president while an election to fill the unexpired term was organised. James Tanis won that election in December 2008 and served until the inauguration of John Momis, the winner of the 2010 elections. As part of the current peace settlement, a referendum on independence is planned to be held in Bougainville sometime before mid-2020. Preparations were underway in 2015.

Numerous Chinese have worked and lived in Papua New Guinea, establishing Chinese-majority communities. Chinese merchants became established in the islands before European exploration. Anti-Chinese rioting involving tens of thousands of people broke out in May 2009. The initial spark was a fight between ethnic Chinese and Papua New Guinean workers at a nickel factory under construction by a Chinese company. Native resentment against Chinese ownership of numerous small businesses and their commercial monopoly in the islands led to the rioting. The Chinese have long been merchants in Papua New Guinea. On the same year, Papua New Guinea asked various southeast Asian nations for their support for Papua New Guinea's full membership bid in the ASEAN. Indonesia supported the bid after Papua New Guinea supported Indonesia's hold on its Papua region. However, Christian-majority Philippines and Buddhist-majority Thailand, Vietnam, and Cambodia have expressed displeasure over Papua New Guinea's anti-LGBT laws, stating that equality-friendly Timor-Leste would most likely be a more feasible ASEAN member state in the future.

From February to March 2018, a chain of earthquakes hit Papua New Guinea, causing various damages. Various nations from Oceania, including Australia and New Zealand, immediately sent aid to the country.

In May 2019, James Marape was appointed as the new prime minister, after a tumultuous few months in the country's political life. Marape was a key minister in his  predecessor Peter O’Neill’s government, and his defection from the government to the opposition camp had finally led to O’Neill's resignation from office. In July 2022, Prime Minister James Marape's PANGU Party secured the most seats of any party in the election, meaning James Marape was elected to continue as PNG's Prime Minister.

Notes

Further reading 
 Anderson, Warwick, The Collector of Lost Souls. Turning Kuru Scientists into Whitemen (2008)
 Biskup, Peter, B. Jinks and H. Nelson. A Short History of New Guinea  (1970)
 Connell, John. Papua New Guinea: The Struggle for Development (1997) 
 Gash, Noel. A pictorial history of New Guinea (1975)
  Golson, Jack. 50,000 years of New Guinea history  (1966)
  Griffin, James. Papua New Guinea: A political history (1979)
 Knauft, Bruce M. South Coast New Guinea Cultures: History, Comparison, Dialectic (1993)  excerpt and text search
 McCosker, Anne. Masked Eden: A History of the Australians in New Guinea (1998)
 Waiko. John. Short History of Papua New Guinea (1993)
 Waiko, John Dademo. Papua New Guinea: A History of Our Times  (2003)
 Zimmer-Tamakoshi, Laura, ed.  Modern Papua New Guinea (1998)

Primary sources
  Jinks, Brian, ed. Readings in New Guinea history (1973)
 Malinowski, Bronislaw. Argonauts of the Western Pacific: An Account of Native Enterprise and Adventure in the Archipelagoes of Melanesian New Guinea (2002) famous anthropological account of the Trobriand Islanders; based on field work in 1910s 
 Visser, Leontine, ed. Governing New Guinea: An Oral History of Papuan Administrators, 1950-1990 (2012)
 Whitaker, J.L. et al. eds. Documents and readings in New Guinea history: Pre-history to 1889  (1975)

External links
 U.S. State Department Background Note: Papua New Guinea
 The Royal Papua and New Guinea Constabulary a Pictorial History Web Page 1885-1975